3rd-seeded Marcos Baghdatis became the first champion of this event, after winning against unseeded Xavier Malisse 6–4, 6–1 in the final.

Seeds

Draw

Final four

Top half

Bottom half

References
 Main Draw
 Qualifying Draw

Trophee des Alpilles - Singles
2009 Singles